, also known as Kazu-ko, was the 
Empress consort of Japan as wife of Emperor Go-Mizunoo. She was a prominent and influential figure the Imperial-shogunate ties and relations, because of her collaboration with her parents Oeyo and Tokugawa Hidetada, the second shōgun of the Edo period.

History

 1620 (Genna 6): Masako entered the palace as a consort of the Emperor Go-Mizunoo.  Although there was already a concubine for Go-Mizunoo, the marriage to Masako was celebrated with great pomp.
 1624: Masako is granted the title of chūgū (中宮), indicating she was a second legitimate wife and therefore an established Empress Consort.  She is the first consort to hold this title since the reign of Emperor Go-Hanazono.

Masako's daughter, Imperial Princess Onna-Ichi-no-miya Okiko, succeeded her father. She ascended the Chrysanthemum Throne as Empress Meishō.  Meishō would be succeeded by two of her half-brothers, who would later become known as Emperor Go-Kōmyō and Emperor Go-Sai. Both had been brought up by Masako as if they were her own sons.

Masako had two younger daughters were Princess Teruko (1625-1651) who married Konoe Hisatsugu, and Princess Akiko (1629-1675), also known as the Third Princess.

Achievements

She used her wealth to bring together Edo and Kyoto and also to help maintain the high standards of the court.  She also used it to restore significant buildings that had been damaged in the previous years of warring.  Many of these restorations were originally credited to her brother Iemitsu, or her husband, but have recently been properly credited to her. Another important way she used her money is as a representation of the Tokugawa clan. When Masako and Lady Kasuga broke a taboo by visiting the imperial court as a commoner, Emperor Go-Mizunoo abdicated, embarrassed, and Meisho became empress. The shōgun, Tokugawa Iemitsu, was now the uncle of the sitting monarch.

Family
 Father: Tokugawa Hidetada (1581-1632)
 Mother: Oeyo (1573-1626)
 Husband: Emperor Go-Mizunoo (1596-1680)
 Children:
, became Empress Meishō
 married Konoe Hisatsugu

 married Nijō Mitsuhira

 Adopted:
 Emperor Go-Kōmyō
 Emperor Go-Sai

Interests

 Empress Masako was a patron of the arts. She collected antiques as well as contemporary art. She was also skilled at calligraphy and dabbled in poetry.

Notes

References
Lillehoj, Elizabeth. "Tōfukumon'in: Empress, Patron and Artist". Woman's Art Journal 17(1996):28–34.
 Ponsonby-Fane, Richard Arthur Brabazon. (1959).  The Imperial House of Japan. Kyoto: Ponsonby Memorial Society. OCLC 194887
 Titsingh, Isaac. (1834). Nihon Ōdai Ichiran; ou,  Annales des empereurs du Japon.  Paris: Royal Asiatic Society, Oriental Translation Fund of Great Britain and Ireland.  OCLC 5850691

Japanese empresses
1607 births
1678 deaths
People of Edo-period Japan
Samurai
Tokugawa clan
1620s in Japan
17th-century Japanese people
17th-century Japanese women